Philip Joseph Christopher Aloysius Regan (May 28, 1906 – February 11, 1996) was an American actor and singer who later served time for bribery in a real estate scandal.

Early years
Born in Brooklyn on May 28, 1908, Regan was the oldest of five children of an Irish immigrant couple who lived in Brooklyn, New York. When he was 13 years old, Regan "had to quit school and drive a team of horses in Brooklyn." Before venturing into a career in entertainment, he went on to work as a boatman, a court clerk, a clerk for an oil company, and a policeman.

Career
Regan worked as a detective on the NYPD, before his singing was overheard by a radio producer at a party. He was signed by CBS radio "as a result of his singing -- gratis -- at a charity benefit." He became known as "The Romantic Singer of Romantic Songs" when he performed with Guy Lombardo and his orchestra on the Burns and Allen radio program. This earned him the nickname "The Singing Cop". Regan went on to headline musical comedies at both Republic and Monogram studios.

His film debut was in The Key.

William Gilmore, in a review of the film Laughing Irish Eyes in the Brooklyn Eagle, described Regan as having "astonishing good looks and an extraordinarily pleasing tenor voice."
He performed the National Anthem at the 1949 inauguration of President Harry S Truman.

In 1951, he was the host of "The Phil Regan Armed Forces Show" on the radio. He left show business in the early 1950's for a new career in public relations, drawing on his contacts.

Later years
Regan retired in the mid-1950s. After retiring, Regan spent his time in his Palm Springs and Santa Barbara houses. Regan dabbled in politics, endorsing Ronald Reagan for governor of California in 1966 against incumbent Pat Brown.

Bribery conviction
In 1972, he became involved with a developer named Halimi, who had created successful developments at Lake Tahoe and elsewhere. Halimi had purchased the option to develop a large coastal property on More Mesa in Santa Barbara, California, which required a permit from Santa Barbara County. He was aware that three of the five supervisors were in favor, but he wanted to find a fourth vote for Halimi to avoid an appeal. He approached Frank Frost in December 1972. Frost had just been elected to the Board of Supervisors and would take office in January. Frost perceived that an attempt at bribery was being arranged and reported his suspicions to the county district attorney and sheriff. A "sting" was planned and Regan passed $1000 to a friend of Frost's who posed as a go-between.

Testimony at Regan's trial established that he had promised an additional $5000 for Frost's vote. Regan was arrested, convicted, and sentenced to two years in prison. He was released after one year. Upon his release, Regan returned to Santa Barbara.

Personal life
Regan and his wife, Josephine Dwyer Regan, had four children.

He supported Adlai Stevenson's Democratic campaign during the 1952 presidential election.

Regan died on 11 February 1996, aged 89, and is interred in Santa Barbara's Calvary Cemetery.

Partial filmography

 All at Sea (1933)
 Student Tour (1934)
 Sweet Adeline (1934)
 We're in the Money (1935)
 Laughing Irish Eyes (1936)
 Happy Go Lucky (1936)
 The Hit Parade (1937)
 Manhattan Merry-Go-Round (1937)
 Outside of Paradise (1938)
 She Married a Cop (1939)
 Flight at Midnight (1939)
 Las Vegas Nights (1941)
 Sweet Rosie O'Grady (1943)
 Sunbonnet Sue (1945)
 Swing Parade of 1946 (1946)             
 Three Little Words (1950)

References

External links

 

1906 births
1996 deaths
Male actors from New York City
New York City Police Department officers
American people of Irish descent
People from Brooklyn
RCA Victor artists
Burials in California
20th-century American male actors
California Democrats
New York (state) Democrats
Majestic Records artists